Caio Marcelo Pinheiro da Silva (born 14 March 1998) is a Brazilian professional footballer who plays as a centre-back for Portuguese club Trofense.

Career
Marcelo had youth stints with Botafogo and Cruzeiro. He began playing for Nova Iguaçu's academy in 2013, remaining for five years whilst scoring five goals in ninety appearances. Campeonato Brasileiro Série A side Vasco da Gama loaned Marcelo in July 2017, as the defender would subsequently feature for their youth ranks. On 3 September 2018, following successful trials, Marcelo joined Orlando Pirates of the South African Premier Division. He was an unused substitute three times up until October, with his professional debut arriving on 3 October during a tie with Golden Arrows. His first goal came a month later versus Polokwane City.

Marcelo left Orlando Pirates on 9 July 2019 after they mutually agreed to part ways, with the South African outfit citing homesickness as the reason. On 16 July, Marcelo moved to Portuguese LigaPro team Casa Pia. He made fifteen appearances in league and cup across 2019–20, though wouldn't feature in the early stages of 2020–21 and would depart in October 2020 to Campeonato de Portugal team Águeda. He debuted in a win over Espinho on 23 October, before scoring in his fifth appearance against Valadares Gaia on 5 December.

Career statistics
.

References

External links

1998 births
Living people
Footballers from Rio de Janeiro (city)
Brazilian footballers
Association football defenders
Campeonato de Portugal (league) players
Orlando Pirates F.C. players
Casa Pia A.C. players
R.D. Águeda players
C.D. Trofense players
South African Premier Division players
Liga Portugal 2 players
Brazilian expatriate footballers
Expatriate soccer players in South Africa
Expatriate footballers in Portugal
Brazilian expatriate sportspeople in South Africa
Brazilian expatriate sportspeople in Portugal